Eir Sport 1 (formerly Setanta Ireland) was an Irish pay television sports channel featuring local and international sporting events. The channel is available on some basic cable packages in Ireland, while it is available upon direct subscription to the Eir Sport package on other networks across Ireland. Its former sister channel is the subscription based network Eir Sport 2.

In June 2013, Setanta Sports signed a long-term agreement with BT Sport to distribute these channels within the Republic of Ireland.  
In November 2015, Irish telecommunications company Eir acquired Setanta Sports. On 5 July 2016, Setanta Ireland was renamed Eir Sport 1.

On 15 August 2019, eir Sport and Virgin Media Sport contracted a deal to show Virgin Media Sport on eir Vision and eir Sport 1 on Virgin Media Ireland. On 13 August 2020, eir Sport 1 was removed from Virgin Media Ireland, as eir refused to pay the contracted distribution license fee.

History
Setanta Sports was formed in 1990 to facilitate the broadcasting of Irish sporting events to Irish expatriates
The Setanta Ireland channel launched in August 2004 as a free bonus channel on the UPC platform (previously Cablelink, then ntl) in the Republic of Ireland. It was also immediately available as a pay TV channel on Sky Ireland, and was followed by the establishment of a full network of sports channels in the UK.
On 5 July 2016 the Setanta Sports brand was replaced in Ireland by EirSport, following the sale of Setanta's irish channels to Eir. 
Setanta Ireland's CEO is Michael O'Rourke, who was one of the original company founders. He took over following the departure of Colin Morgan in late 2012. Niall Cogley was the CEO prior to that.
The company's production headquarters is in Broadcasting House, Princes Street South, Dublin 2, Ireland.
Senior positions include Brendan Higgins CFO, Brian Quinn Marketing Director, Trevor Twamley Advertising Sales Director, Graham Byrne Head of commercial premises
The name 'Setanta', comes from the name of the ancient Irish Warrior 'Setanta' from Ulster who frequently played the oldest known field sport, hurling, and who was later given the name 'Cúchulainn' as described in the ancient Irish texts of the 'Annals of Ulster'
Setanta acquired the Premier League highlights rights for the Republic of Ireland in August 2013, taking over from RTÉ. In July 2016, it was announced that they had lost these rights to Sky Sports Ireland with effect from the 2016/17 Premier League season.

Closure
Eir announced on 19 May 2021 that all of their sports channels would close before the end of the year. Eir Sport 1 shut down in Northern Ireland on 28 June and so did X1 and X2. Eir Sport 2 closed on 20 July. Eir Sport 1 closed on 28 October, marking an end to the Eir Sport channels.

Programming
In Ireland, Eir Sport 1 broadcasts League of Ireland, Setanta Sports Cup, Premier League (ROI only), Allianz Leagues GAA, F1, The Masters, The Open Championship, Europa League, Champions League, Roland Garros, Live Horseracing and Golf Channel programming.

For a brief period from June 2011, Setanta Ireland experimented with music programming and Irish films as part of its line-up.

In 2012 Setanta had the Irish rights to cover all of Liverpool's home games live in the 2012–13 UEFA Europa League group stage.

In August 2013, Setanta Ireland started showing Premier League Highlights for the first time. The new show Premier League Central took over from RTÉ who had previously held the rights. The show goes out on Saturday and Sunday nights and is hosted by Connor Morris.

In June 2013, Setanta Ireland added the newly formed UK sports broadcaster BT Sport to its platform for Republic of Ireland sports fans. This resulted in the Setanta Sports pack in the ROI containing six channels; Setanta Ireland, Setanta 1, BT Sport 1, BT Sport 2, BT Sport Europe & ESPN. All programming available on the Eir Sport pack can found below.

Football

 Republic of Ireland women's national football team
 Republic of Ireland national under-21 football team
 League of Ireland
  Setanta Sports Cup
 League of Ireland Cup
 Magazine shows including Champions League Magazine, Serie A highlights,  Ligue 1 Highlights and Goalissimo
 Pre-Season friendlies featuring Premier League Teams
 Classic Premier League
Copa América
Copa Libertadores
Copa Sudamericana

Golf
Masters Tournament 
Open Championship 
Royal Trophy live from Asia – 3 days in December
Golf Channel Content including  the Feherty show, Big Break Ireland and Being John Daly
Golf Central from Golf Channel

Rugby
Irish Schools Rugby
Six Nations - highlights
National Rugby League
In Touch – weekly rugby highlights

North American sports
NFL 
NBA 
NHL
NCCA football & basketball
NHL Tonight – Magazine show
NASCAR

Horseracing
Over 50 days of live racing from various UK meetings
Mark your card – weekly horse racing show

Tennis
Roland Garros
Wimbledon

Other
Paralympics 2012 & 2016
World Rally Championship - Rally Preview and Highlights 
Sundry MMA events including cage contender
Boxing Magazine shows
Sundry Athletic Shows including the Great North Run
Irish Sports Documentaries commissioned for Setanta
European Games

GAA
 Allianz Leagues - live
 GAA Championship - deferred coverage
 GAA Club Championship - live

Ownership

see Eir Sport.

Eir Sport 1 HD

Eir Sport 1 HD is a high definition simulcast of Eir Sport 1. The channel was the first ever Irish owned HD channel in the Republic of Ireland. It launched on 23 November 2010 then known as Setanta HD.

The former company Setanta had previously hoped to have a high-definition channel launched by August 2008, in time for the 2008–09 Premier League season.

Other programming
Setanta's major in-house programme was The Sports Show (formerly The Hub) which aired sports highlights and news three times daily across 2009 and 2010.  A previous version of the programme called The Hub ran from 2005-09. Setanta also simulcast the radio show Off The Ball from Newstalk.

Setanta Sports Cup
Setanta was the sponsor of the Setanta Sports Cup, an annual soccer tournament which featured teams from the League of Ireland and Irish Football League from 2005-14.

Availability
As of 5 July 2016 in the Republic of Ireland, the Eir Sport Package is available for free to any Eir broadband customer. This includes the BT Sport package. Additionally, since 1 August 2016, the Eir Sport Package is available on Eir TV, Sky Ireland and Vodafone TV.  Eir Sport offers commercial venues in Ireland programming of sports such as football (soccer), Gaelic football, hurling, golf, cricket, rugby union and rugby league and boxing.

BT Sport deal 
On 24 June 2013, Eir Sport (previously Setanta Sports) announced that it had struck a 3-year deal with BT Sport to carry the BT Sport 1, BT Sport 2 and ESPN channels as part of the Setanta pack in the Republic of Ireland.  The HD feeds of these channels are also available at no extra cost. In September 2015, BT Sport Europe was added to the pack. BT Sport Europe was introduced to broadcast the BT Sport's live UEFA Champions League and UEFA Europa League matches. The deal ran until 2019, when Sky TV took over BT's distribution rights in Ireland, bundling BT's channels with that of Premier Sports to produce the Sky Sports Extra bundle, only available in Ireland.

Closure
Eir announced on 19 May 2021 that eir Sport 1 would close before the end of 2021. Eir also announced that eir Sport 2 will close on 20 July 2021.

See also
 Eir Sport
 Eir Sport 2

References

External links
 

Sports mass media in Ireland
Television channels and stations established in 2004
Television channels and stations disestablished in 2021
2004 establishments in Ireland
2021 disestablishments in Ireland
Defunct television channels
Association football on Irish television